Violent Demise: The Last Days is the third studio album by American heavy metal band Body Count. The album was released on March 11, 1997, by Virgin Records. It is the last album to feature drummer Beatmaster V, who died of leukemia following the recording of the album, which is dedicated to him. It is also the final full album to feature rhythm guitarist D-Roc the Executioner, who died from lymphoma during production of their next album Murder 4 Hire. It also marks the last appearance of sampler Sean E Sean and hype man Sean E. Mac, who both departed the band in 2001. Sean E Sean would return to the group in 2008, but Ice T's son Little Ice replaced Sean E. Mac in 2016.

Lyrics and themes
Among other subjects, the album features songs focusing on topical subjects such as the O. J. Simpson murder case ("I Used To Love Her") and Dr. Jack Kevorkian ("Dr. K"). The cover art depicts the hand signs of the gangs Bloods and Crips, which the band's initials, "B.C." stand for.

Track listing

Personnel
Ice-T – lead vocals
Ernie C – lead guitar, guitar synthesizer
D-Roc the Executioner – rhythm guitar
Griz – bass guitar, loops and samples
Beatmaster V – drums
Jonathon "the Kidd" James – drums
Sean E Sean – sampler, backing vocals
Sean E. Mac – hype man, backing vocals

Guest musicians 
Raw Breed – vocals on "My Way"

References

1997 albums
Body Count (band) albums
Virgin Records albums
Albums produced by Howard Benson